Assalamualikum and Burhan al-Din is a male Muslim name, formed from the elements Burhan and ad-Din, meaning proof of the religion. It may refer to:

Burhan al-Din al-Marghinani (1135–1197), Islamic scholar
Burhan al-Din al-Zarnuji (died 1223), Islamic scholar
Burhanuddin Gharib (died 1344), Indian saint of the Chishti Order
Ghazi Burhanuddin, first Muslim resident of Sylhet
Kadi Burhan al-Din (died 1398), vizier and atabeg to the Eretnid rulers of Anatolia
Burhan-ud-din Kermani (15th century), Persian physician
Tuan Burhanudeen Jayah (1890–1960), Sri Lankan educationalist, politician, and diplomat
Prince Burhan-ud-Din of Chitral (1915–1996), officer of the Indian National Army
Mohammed Burhanuddin (1915–2014), Indian, Dai of the Dawoodi Bohras
Burhanuddin Harahap (1917–1987), Prime Minister of Indonesia
Burhanuddin Rabbani (1940–2011), President of Afghanistan
Burhan al-Din al-Marghinani, Islamic scholar
Burhanettin Kaymak (born 1973), German footballer

Arabic masculine given names